Hagen-Heubing station is a through station in the city of Hagen in the German state of North Rhine-Westphalia. The station was opened along with a section of the Düsseldorf-Derendorf–Dortmund Süd railway, opened by the Rhenish Railway Company (RhE) between Wuppertal-Wichlinghausen and Hagen RhE station (now Hagen-Eckesey depot) on 15 September 1879. It was closed on 14 May 1950, but reopened in 1968. It has two platform tracks and it is classified by Deutsche Bahn as a category 6 station.

The station is served by Rhine-Ruhr S-Bahn line S 8 between Mönchengladbach and Hagen and line S 9 between Recklinghausen and Hagen, both every 60 minutes.

The station is also served by four bus routes operated by Hagener Straßenbahn AG: 510 (every 15–30 minutes), 525 (30), 528 (30) and 532 (60).

Notes

S8 (Rhine-Ruhr S-Bahn)
S9 (Rhine-Ruhr S-Bahn)
Rhine-Ruhr S-Bahn stations
Railway stations in Germany opened in 1879